Seticosta droserana is a species of moth of the family Tortricidae. It is found in Napo Province, Ecuador.

The wingspan is 24 mm. The ground colour of the forewings is pale yellowish with a slight olive hue and brown olive strigulation (fine streaks). The ground colour is paler along the edges of some parts of the markings. These markings are darker than the strigulation. The hindwings are cream with pale brownish terminal suffusion and paler strigulae.

Etymology
The species name refers to the colouration of the forewings and is derived from Greek droseros (meaning moistened by dew).

References

Moths described in 2009
Seticosta